Valkyrien is a Norwegian TV series.

Valkyrien may also refer to:

HNoMS Valkyrien, any of several ships in the  Royal Norwegian Navy
Valda Valkyrien (1895–1956), Danish actress

See also
Valkyrie (disambiguation)